Vladimir Aleksandrovich Shcherbakov (1945 in Moscow – 1993 in Moscow) was a Soviet football player.

Honours
 Soviet Top League winner: 1965.

International career
Shcherbakov played his only game for USSR on September 4, 1965 in a friendly against Yugoslavia.

External links
  Profile

1945 births
1993 deaths
Soviet footballers
Soviet Union international footballers
PFC CSKA Moscow players
FC Torpedo Moscow players
FC Shinnik Yaroslavl players
Soviet Top League players
Russian footballers

Association football forwards